Echinochloa frumentacea (Indian barnyard millet, sawa millet, or billion dollar grass)  is a species of Echinochloa. Both Echinochloa frumentacea and E. esculenta are called Japanese millet. This millet is widely grown as a cereal in India, Pakistan, and Nepal. Its wild ancestor is the tropical grass Echinochloa colona, but the exact date or region of domestication is uncertain. It is cultivated on marginal lands where rice and other crops will not grow well. The grains are cooked in water, like rice, or boiled with milk and sugar. Sometimes it is fermented to make beer. While also being part of staple diet for some communities in India, these seeds are, in particular, (cooked and) eaten during religious fasting (willingly abstaining from some types of food / food ingredients). For this reason, these seeds are commonly also referred to as "" in Hindi (i.e., "rice for fasting", literally).

Pests
Insect pests include:

Root feeders
white grubs Holotrichia sp., Anomala dimidiata, and Apogonia sp. (in India)

Seedling feeders
shoot fly Atherigona falcata
Atherigona pulla, Atherigona simplex, Atherigona soccata, Atherigona oryzae, and Atherigona nudiseta
armyworm Mythimna separata
thrips Haplothrips ganglbaueri
stem borers Sesamia inferens, Chilo partellus, and Chilo diffusilineus

Sucking pests
leafhoppers Nephotettix cincticeps, Sogatella furcifera, and Sogatella kolophon
plant hoppers Nilaparvata lugens and Peregrinus maidis
leaf bug Cletus punctiger
aphids Hysteroneura setariae and Macrosiphum eleusines

Leaf feeders
grasshoppers Acrida exaltata, Atractomorpha crenulata, Hieroglyphus banian, Hieroglyphus daganensis, Hieroglyphus nigrorepletus, Oxya nitidula and Oxya bidentata
leaf caterpillar Euproctis similis

Developing grain pests
bugs Agonoscelis pubescens, Dolycoris indicus, and Nezara viridula

See also
 Echinochloa esculenta, also called Japanese barnyard millet

References

Millets
frumentacea
Cereals
Flora of Malta